Red River Valley Brick Co. is or was a property in Grand Forks, North Dakota that was removed from the National Register of Historic Places in 2004.

It was built or has other significance in 1909. The listing described Early Commercial, Vernacular, and other architecture.

The property was covered in a 1981 study of Downtown Grand Forks historical resources.

References

External links
mention in a Google book

Former National Register of Historic Places in North Dakota
Buildings and structures in Grand Forks, North Dakota
Vernacular architecture in North Dakota
Commercial buildings completed in 1909
Brickworks in the United States